Gerald Lascelles is the name of:

 Gerald William Lascelles (1849–1928), author and Deputy Surveyor of the New Forest, England
 Gerald Hubert Lascelles (1876–1928), son of Gerald William Lascelles
 Gerald David Lascelles (1924–1998), younger son of 6th Earl of Harewood and Princess Mary, Princess Royal, President of the British Racing Drivers' Club from 1964 to 1991